Roshanak Hosseini (born 10 January 1993), also known as Roshana Hoss, is a Swedish pop singer and songwriter.

Biography
Roshana was born in Falun to Iranian parents. She was a member of pop group Love Generation until November 2010.

References

External links 
 Roshana's Facebook Page. Retrieved 2 February 2013.

1993 births
Living people
Swedish people of Iranian descent
21st-century Swedish singers
21st-century Swedish women singers